William James Dwyer (9 May 1887 – 10 May 1951) was an Irish politician and businessman.

He was born 9 May 1887 in Cork city, second son among three sons and two daughters of Walter Dwyer of Sunday's Well, Cork, merchant and later director and managing director of Dwyer & Co., and Clare Dwyer (née Downing). He was educated at Presentation Brothers College, Cork; and Downside School, Somerset, England. 

On finishing school in 1905, he returned to Cork to join his fathers' company. It was founded by his grandfather in the nineteenth century, and had become a large concern involved in the manufacture of clothing for men and boys. His experience within the family business helped to educate him in all aspects of the manufacturing process, to the extent that he left the firm in 1913 and set up his own hosiery factory.

Following the success of his hosiery business. in 1928 he founded Sunbeam Knitwear Co., which manufactured knitted underwear. In 1933 he acquired the Irish business of Wolsey Ltd (an English-based underwear manufacturer) and merged it with Sunbeam Ltd to create Sunbeam Wolsey Ltd.

He was an unsuccessful Fine Gael candidate at the 1943 general election for the Cork Borough constituency. He was elected to Dáil Éireann at the 1944 general election as an independent Teachta Dála (TD) for Cork Borough.

He resigned his seat on 29 March 1946 because he felt that he was neglecting his continually expanding commercial concerns. The subsequent by-election on 14 June 1946 was won by Patrick McGrath of Fianna Fáil. He stood unsuccessfully as an independent candidate at the 1948 general election for the Cork East constituency.

A devout catholic who took a deep interest in the welfare of his workers and the working classes in general, he founded the Sunbeam Social Service Society. Partly run by the workers, the society provided free medical, dental, and marriage benefits as well as home nursing to those who required it. He also helped to organise the Marsh Building Society to build homes for the working classes. In addition to this he funded the building of a recreation hall in a housing area near Spangle Hill in Cork. His most generous benefaction was the reconstruction of the Church of the Annunciation, Blackpool, which he then donated to the cathedral parish of Blackrock. In 1950 he both organised and met half the costs of a pilgrimage to Rome for his workers. In recognition of his services to the church and charity in general he was granted a private audience with the pope in 1951.

He married Agnes Harding in 1912, and they had one son and three daughters. He died on 10 May 1951 at the Bon Secours nursing home in Cork.

References

1887 births
1951 deaths
Fine Gael politicians
Independent TDs
Members of the 12th Dáil
Politicians from County Cork
People educated at Presentation Brothers College, Cork
People educated at Downside School